Farhan Zulkifli (born 10 November 2002) is a Singaporean professional footballer who plays as a plays as a full-back or winger for Singapore Premier League club Hougang United and the Singapore national team.

Club career

Hougang United

2019 
Farhan was brought on as a substitute and scored 12 minutes into his Singapore Premier League (SPL) debut against Home United on 29 June 2019. At 16 years and 231 days, he became the SPL’s second-youngest ever scorer then. Farhan was named in Goal Singapore's NxGn 2020 list as one of the country's biggest talents following his impressive start to life at Hougang. He made a further 11 appearances for Hougang in the 2019 Singapore Premier League season.

2020 
Farhan would start both the SPL opener and the Community Shield game in 2020. However, the 2020 Singapore Premier League season hasn’t been the best of years for Farhan, by his own admission. Farhan played in 12 matches and only had a solitary goal to his name.

2021 
Farhan would play a total of 1767 minutes in 2021 and bagging 20 appearances however failed to score a goal once during the 2021 Singapore Premier League season.

2022 
2022 for Farhan could be called his breakout year as he managed to make 18 appearances for the team and scoring 1 goal during the 5-1 thrashing of Young Lions. Farhan also played a crucial role in Hougang United's triumph over Tampines Rovers in the Singapore Cup finals, helping his team stun Tampines 3-2 to clinch the cup.

International career
Farhan was first called up to the national team in 2019, for the friendly against Jordan on 5 October and the World Cup qualifiers against Saudi Arabia and Uzbekistan on 10 October and 15 October respectively.

In 2022, Farhan was called up to the national team for the 2022 AFF Championship.

Career statistics

Club

Notes

References

Living people
2002 births
Singaporean footballers
Association football midfielders
Singapore Premier League players
Young Lions FC players
Tampines Rovers FC players